Ashby is a historic home located in Scott Township, Montgomery County, Indiana. It was built in 1883, and is a two-story, three bay, "L"-shaped, Italianate style brick dwelling on a limestone foundation. It has a hipped roof, wood entrance portico, and arched double door entrance.

It was listed on the National Register of Historic Places in 1980.

References

Houses on the National Register of Historic Places in Indiana
Houses completed in 1883
Italianate architecture in Indiana
Houses in Montgomery County, Indiana
National Register of Historic Places in Montgomery County, Indiana